Abhash Thapa (born 19 December 1998) is an Indian professional footballer who plays as a defender or midfielder for Mohammedan in the I-League.

Club career 
Abhash started his youth career in Mohammedan U14. In 2012, he moved to Mohun Bagan U18 team and played there for 4 years. In 2016, he joined Royal Wahingdoh, followed by Bhawanipore and played in CFL Premiere Division B. In 2017–18 season, he joined Real Kashmir, which that time played in I-League 2nd Division. That season, he made 7 appearances for Real Kashmir, and got promoted to I-League. In I-League, he made 15 appearances. On 1 September 2019 he got transferred to the new Indian Super League franchise Hyderabad. He couldn't debut in the club. He was loaned to East Bengal on 8 January 2020, till the end of the season.

Mohammedan
In June 2022, Thapa joined I-League club Mohammedan, on a two-year deal. On 16 August, he made his debut for the club against Goa in the Durand Cup, which ended in a 3–1 comeback win. He assisted Faslu Rahman for their second goal with an inch-perfect cross.

Career statistics

Club

Honours
Real Kashmir
IFA Shield: 2020

References

External links

Real Kashmir FC players
1998 births
Living people
Footballers from West Bengal
Indian footballers
I-League players
East Bengal Club players
Association football forwards
Royal Wahingdoh FC players
Bhawanipore FC players
Indian Super League players
Hyderabad FC players
I-League 2nd Division players
Mohammedan SC (Kolkata) players